Nərimanabad is a village and municipality in the Yevlakh Rayon of Azerbaijan. It has a population of 1,680.

References

Populated places in Yevlakh District